The House of the Dead 2 & 3 Return is a compilation and re-release of The House of the Dead 2 and III for Wii. It is compatible with the Wii Zapper peripheral.

Gameplay
The House of the Dead 2 has the arcade and original games. It also includes a boss mode in which any boss from the game can be battled. The House of the Dead 2 also has a training mode, a set of minigames.

The House of the Dead 3 has a time attack mode where health is replaced with time. The House of the Dead 3 also includes a new unlockable 'extreme' game mode, with tougher enemies and a smaller blast radius on the shotgun. In addition, weapons can now be used as a melee attack to block enemy blows. The melee attack requires the player to reload after each use.

Reception

The game was met with average to mixed reviews upon release.  GameRankings gave it 65.97%, while Metacritic gave it 66 out of 100.

Nintendo Power gave the game 7 out of 10. They stated that the lack of extras was disappointing, but the game was praised and they felt that the price seemed quite reasonable. IGN gave the game 6 out of 10. They praised the IR functionality, saying it is one of the Wii's best, and the flawless port of The House of the Dead 2, but stated that The House of the Dead 3 suffers from some technical issues and criticized the lack of extras, stating that the price seems almost too high; however, they did state that the games are still great and fun to play and recommended the game to die-hard fans and anyone wanting a great lightgun game. GameSpot likewise gave it 6 out of 10, commenting that "The 'dogs of the AMS' make their move to the Wii in this fun but brief port of the on-rails arcade shooters."

See also
List of light gun games

References

External links
Official Japanese website

2008 video games
Cooperative video games
Light gun games
Rail shooters
Sega video game compilations
The House of the Dead
Video games developed in Japan
Wii games
Wii-only games
Wii Zapper games